The Flying Saucers were an influential Teddy Boy rockabilly band from Edmonton, North London, England. The group formed in 1972, released six albums, completed numerous world tours and appeared in the international film Blue Suede Shoes, before disbanding in 1986.

Biography
The Flying Saucers were formed in 1972 by bassist Pete Pritchard, drummer Terry Earl, guitarist Chris Townsend, and Rhythm guitarist/ vocalist Alan Jones. Jones and Townsend left the group in 1975 and were replaced by guitarist Nigel "Niggsy" Owen and vocalist Sandy Ford, who remained with the group. Jacko Buddin on saxophone was also added to the line up around this time. 
With help from a renewed interest in Rockabilly music and The British subculture movement known as Teddy Boy, The Flying Saucers toured Europe and earned recording contracts with EMI Music.

The Flying Saucers are best known for performing in the back of a truck during the 1976 Teddy Boy March in London. This march was part of a successful plan to promote the airplay of rockabilly music on BBC national Radio One. Within a matter of weeks, BBC disc jockeys Stuart Colman and Geoff Barker presented  "It's Rock ‘n’ Roll," an hourly show which featured the music of bands making music in the style of 1950s rock music, and a long list of guest performers including The Flying Saucers, Dave Edmunds and Crazy Cavan & The Rhythm Rockers amongst many others. The 1976 Teddy Boy March is often credited as the spark which ignited the Rockabilly revival and explosion in popularity of younger rockabilly acts such as Stray Cats and The Blasters during the early 1980s. Due to polished production and strategic artist promotion from EMI, the band's major label releases are often associated with the new wave scene, which embraced an entirely new generation of rockabilly-inspired groups. In 1980, The Flying Saucers appeared in the film Blue Suede Shoes, which was a documentary on rock and roll directed by Curtis Clark. The film starred notable pioneering rock artists such as Bill Haley & His Comets.

After numerous personnel changes, The Flying Saucers disbanded during the mid 1980s.
 
Pete Pritchard went on to become a session player and touring bassist, backing guitarist Alvin Lee of Ten Years After and playing bass for Scotty Moore, DJ Fontana and the Jordanaires on several tours. Pritchard was a co-founder of the independent blues record label Alligator Records, which has showcased seasoned artists and offered several new acts their first chance to record. In 2011, Pritchard was inducted into the International Rockabilly Hall of Fame.

The original singer was Alan St John from the days they were called North nine and they changed their name to The Flying Saucers  As the only original member of the group, Ford continues to tour and record with a reconstituted version of The Flying Saucers, billed as "Sandy Ford's Flying Saucers." 

In 1991, Sandy Ford's Flying Saucers appeared in British film Buddy's Song, starring Roger Daltrey, Chesney Hawkes, Sharon Duce and Michael Elphick. The film was a sequel to the 1986 BBC television series Buddy, which starred Daltrey in the same role (it featured Wayne Goddard as Buddy, however). Daltrey, Bill Curbishley and Roy Baird acted as producers for the film and Daltrey also served as musical director. The film was accompanied by a soundtrack album which featured Hawkes' hit "The One and Only". It was filmed in London and various towns in the Thames Valley. Starring as a teddy boy Rockabilly group, Sandy Ford's Flying Saucers play the roles of themselves in the film. Playing the part of Terry's friends, they offer support by rehearsing with Buddy and becoming his backing band. Buddy contributes vocals and rhythm guitar while Sandy Ford handles lead guitar duties.

Discography

Albums
1976:  Planet Of The Drapes  (Nevis)
1977:  Rock & Roll Graffiti House (Japan release)
1977:  Diana and Other Hits from The Sixties''' (Muza) Poland release
1978:  Keep On Coming (Alaska)
1981:  Some Like It Hot (EMI)
1982:  Flying Tonight (EMI)
1983:  Live At The Pickett's Lock'' (Charly)

References

External links
The Flying Saucers extended discography
Discography page
Bio of The Flying Saucers & Sandy Ford by Big Beat Entertainment
Sandy Ford's Flying Saucers performing with Roger Daltrey and Chesney Hawkes in the film Buddy's Song

Rockabilly music groups
English rock music groups
Musical groups from London
EMI Records artists